Jason Thomas Knight (born July 14, 1992) is an American bare knuckle boxer and a professional mixed martial artist. He has previously competed in the UFC and Titan FC.

Background
Reared in D'Iberville, Mississippi, Knight began training at the age of 14 to stay out of trouble and street fighting. He attended George County High School before dropping out at the age of 16, and began training with UFC veteran Alan Belcher.

Mixed martial arts career

Early career
Knight began competing as an amateur at the age of 14, and fought ten times before turning professional in 2009 at age 17. He then compiled a record of 16–1 before being signed by the UFC.

Ultimate Fighting Championship
Knight made his promotional debut against Tatsuya Kawajiri on December 11, 2015 at The Ultimate Fighter 22 Finale, replacing Mirsad Bektić on two weeks' notice. He lost the fight via unanimous decision.

Knight faced Jim Alers on July 23, 2016 at UFC on Fox 20. He won the fight via split decision. The combat was awarded the Fight of the Night bonus.

Knight next faced Dan Hooker on November 26, 2016 at UFC Fight Night 101. He won the fight via unanimous decision.

Knight faced Alex Caceres on January 28, 2017 at UFC on Fox 23. He won the fight via submission in the second round, winning his first Performance of the Night bonus.

Knight faced Chas Skelly on May 13, 2017 at UFC 211.  He won the fight via TKO in the third round. The win also earned Knight his second consecutive Performance of the Night bonus award.

Knight faced Ricardo Lamas on July 29, 2017 at UFC 214. He lost the fight via TKO in the first round.

Knight faced Gabriel Benítez on December 9, 2017 at UFC Fight Night 123. He lost the fight via unanimous decision.

Knight faced Makwan Amirkhani on May 27, 2018 at UFC Fight Night 130. Despite four successful knockdowns during the three-round fight, Knight lost via a contentious split decision.

Knight faced Jordan Rinaldi on November 3, 2018 at UFC 230. He lost the fight via unanimous decision and was subsequently released by the organization.

Post-UFC career
Following the stint in bare-knuckle boxing, Knight was expected to make his return to mixed martial arts against Christopher Ramírez at iKon Fighting Federation 5 on March 5, 2021. However, Ramírez had to withdraw from the fight due to problems getting into the United States and was replaced by Taurean Bogguess. In turn, Bogguess withdrew during the fight week and was replaced by Cliff Wright. Knight won the bout via second-round submission.

On May 29, 2021, it was announced that Knight is scheduled to headline the inaugural event of Jorge Masvidal's Gamebred Fighting Championship against Charles Bennett on June 18, 2021. The bout had typical mixed martial arts rules, but was contested without gloves. Knight was knocked down early on, but went on to win the fight via rear-naked choke submission in round one.

Following the successful bout in Gamebred FC, Knight signed with the Professional Fighters League and faced Bobby Moffett at PFL 9 on August 27, 2021. At weigh-ins, Moffett weighed in at 148.2 pounds, missing weight by 2.2  pounds. The bout proceeded at catchweight and Moffett was fined a percentage of his purse, which went to Knight. He lost the bout via unanimous decision.

On May 19, 2022,  Knight headlined Gulf Coast MMA 15 against Rey Trujillo. Knight defeated his opponent by a first round TKO.

Bare knuckle boxing
Following his UFC release, Knight signed a one-fight contract with Bare Knuckle Fighting Championship. He faced Artem Lobov in the main event of Bare Knuckle FC 5 on April 6, 2019. Knight lost the bout and several of his teeth.

Knight was expected to headline Bare Knuckle FC 7 on August 10, 2019 against Leonard Garcia. However on July 15, 2019, Knight revealed on his social media that he was forced to withdraw from the bout due to a rib injury.

Knight defeated Artem Lobov in a rematch headlining Bare Knuckle FC 9 on November 16, 2019, earning the victory by TKO in the fifth round.

Personal life
In 2012, Knight was arrested and charged with grand larceny.

Championships and accomplishments

Mixed martial arts
Ultimate Fighting Championship
 Fight of the Night (One time) vs. Jim Alers
 Performance of the Night (Two times) 
Atlas Fights
Atlas Fights Featherweight Championship (One time)
One successful title defense
Interim Atlas Fights Featherweight Championship (One time)

Mixed martial arts record

|-
|Win
|align=center|23-7
|Rey Trujillo
|TKO (punches) 
|Gulf Coast MMA 15
|
|align=center|1
|align=center|2:05
|Biloxi, Mississippi, United States
|
|-
|Loss
|align=center|22–7
|Bobby Moffett
|Decision (unanimous)
|PFL 9 
|
|align=center|3
|align=center|5:00
|Hollywood, Florida, United States
|
|-
|Win
|align=center|22–6
|Charles Bennett
|Submission (rear-naked choke)
|Gamebred Fighting Championships 1
|
|align=center|1
|align=center|3:01
|Biloxi, Mississippi, United States
|
|-
|Win
|align=center|21–6
|Cliff Wright
|Submission (rear-naked choke)
|iKon Fighting Federation 5
|
|align=center|2
|align=center|1:48
|Biloxi, Mississippi, United States
|
|-
|Loss
|align=center|20–6
|Jordan Rinaldi
|Decision (unanimous)
|UFC 230 
|
|align=center|3
|align=center|5:00
|New York City, New York, United States
|
|-
|Loss
|align=center|20–5
|Makwan Amirkhani
|Decision (split)
|UFC Fight Night: Thompson vs. Till
|
|align=center|3
|align=center|5:00
|Liverpool, England
|
|-
|Loss
|align=center|20–4
|Gabriel Benítez
|Decision (unanimous)
|UFC Fight Night: Swanson vs. Ortega 
|
|align=center|3
|align=center|5:00
|Fresno, California, United States
|
|-
|Loss
|align=center|20–3
|Ricardo Lamas
|TKO (punches)
|UFC 214
|
|align=center|1
|align=center|4:34
|Anaheim, California, United States
|
|-
|Win
|align=center|20–2
|Chas Skelly
|TKO (punches)
|UFC 211
|
|align=center|3
|align=center|0:39
|Dallas, Texas, United States
|
|-
|Win
|align=center|19–2
|Alex Caceres
|Submission (rear-naked choke)
|UFC on Fox: Shevchenko vs. Peña
|
|align=center|2
|align=center|4:21
|Denver, Colorado, United States
|
|-
|Win
|align=center|18–2
|Dan Hooker
|Decision (unanimous)
|UFC Fight Night: Whittaker vs. Brunson
|
|align=center|3
|align=center|5:00
|Melbourne, Australia
|  
|-
|Win
|align=center|17–2
|Jim Alers
|Decision (split)
|UFC on Fox: Holm vs. Shevchenko
|
|align=center|3
|align=center|5:00
|Chicago, Illinois, United States
|
|-
|Loss
|align=center|16–2
|Tatsuya Kawajiri
|Decision (unanimous)
|The Ultimate Fighter: Team McGregor vs. Team Faber Finale
|
|align=center|3
|align=center|5:00
|Las Vegas, Nevada, United States
|
|-
|Win
|align=center|16–1
|Musa Khamanaev
|Submission (triangle choke)
|Titan FC 35
|
|align=center|2
|align=center|3:06
|Ridgefield, Washington, United States
|
|-
|Win
|align=center|15–1
|Thiago Moisés
|Decision (unanimous)
|Atlas Fights 25
|
|align=center|3
|align=center|5:00
|Biloxi, Mississippi, United States
|
|-
|Win
|align=center|14–1
|Michael Roberts
|Decision (unanimous)
|Atlas Fights 23
|
|align=center|5
|align=center|5:00
|Biloxi, Mississippi, United States
|
|-
|Win
|align=center|13–1
|Gilbert Burgos
|Submission (gogoplata)
|Atlas FC 4
|
|align=center|1
|align=center|1:23
|Biloxi, Mississippi, United States
|
|-
|Win
|align=center|12–1
|Harry Johnson
|Submission (Von Flue choke)
|V3 Fights: Johnson vs. Shuffield
|
|align=center|2
|align=center|4:38
|Memphis, Tennessee, United States
|
|-
|Win
|align=center|11–1
|Tony Way
|Submission (inverted triangle choke)
|Atlas Fights: Battle on Mobile Bay
|
|align=center|1
|align=center|2:03
|Mobile, Alabama, United States
|
|-
|Win
|align=center|10–1
|Ronald Jacobs
|TKO (punches)
|Atlas Fights 20
|
|align=center|1
|align=center|1:43
|Biloxi, Mississippi, United States
|
|-
|Win
|align=center|9–1
|Bradley Collins
|Submission (armbar) 
|Atlas Fights 19
|
|align=center|1
|align=center|1:06
|Biloxi, Mississippi, United States
|
|-
|Win
|align=center|8–1
|Matt McCook
|Submission (rear naked choke) 
|Atlas Fights 13
|
|align=center|1
|align=center|0:52
|Biloxi, Mississippi, United States
|
|-
|Loss
|align=center|7–1
|Michael Roberts
|Decision (unanimous)
|Atlas Fights 12
|
|align=center|3
|align=center|5:00
|Biloxi, Mississippi, United States
|
|-
|Win
|align=center|7–0
|Shawn Hayes
|Submission (triangle choke)
|Atlas Fights 10
|
|align=center|3
|align=center|4:33
|Biloxi, Mississippi, United States
|
|-
|Win
|align=center|6–0
|James Rutherford
|Submission (guillotine choke)
|Atlas Fights 9
|
|align=center|1
|align=center|3:31
|Biloxi, Mississippi, United States
|
|-
|Win
|align=center|5–0
|Jonathan Burdine
|TKO (punches) 
|FFI: Blood and Sand 10
|
|align=center|1
|align=center|2:05
|Biloxi, Mississippi, United States
|
|-
|Win
|align=center|4–0
|Ronald Jacobs
|Submission (triangle choke) 
|UEP: Battle at the Beach
|
|align=center|2
|align=center|2:22
|Daphne, Alabama, United States
|
|-
|Win
|align=center|3–0
|Daren Hayes
|Submission (triangle choke) 
|UEP: Battle at the Beach
|
|align=center|1
|align=center|3:04
|Orange Beach, Alabama, United States
|
|-
|Win
|align=center|2–0
|Shawn Hayes
|Submission (armbar)
|No Love Entertainment
|
|align=center|1
|align=center|1:50
|Biloxi, Mississippi, United States
|
|-
|Win
|align=center|1–0
|Patrick Needham
|Submission (triangle choke)
|UEP: The Reckoning
|
|align=center|1
|align=center|1:10
|Orange Beach, Alabama, United States
|
|-

Bare knuckle record

|Win
|align=center|1–1
|Artem Lobov
|TKO (corner stoppage)
|Bare Knuckle FC 9
|
|align=center|5
|align=center|0:27
|Biloxi, Mississippi, United States
|
|-
|Loss
|align=center|0–1
|Artem Lobov
|Decision (unanimous)
|Bare Knuckle FC 5
|
|align=center|5
|align=center|2:00
|Biloxi, Mississippi, United States
|
|-

See also
List of male mixed martial artists

References

External links
 
 

1992 births
American male mixed martial artists
Featherweight mixed martial artists
Mixed martial artists utilizing boxing
Mixed martial artists utilizing Brazilian jiu-jitsu
Living people
Mixed martial artists from Mississippi
People from D'Iberville, Mississippi
American male boxers
Bare-knuckle boxers
Ultimate Fighting Championship male fighters
American practitioners of Brazilian jiu-jitsu